Patrick Carl Shurmur (born April 14, 1965) is an American football coach who most recently served as the offensive coordinator for the Denver Broncos of the National Football League (NFL) from 2020 to 2021. A 32-year coaching veteran, Shurmur has 21 seasons of NFL experience, including the last 11 years as a head coach or offensive coordinator. Shurmur has four years of experience as a head coach, working in that role with the New York Giants from 2018 to 2019 and with the Cleveland Browns from 2011 to 2012. He also served as interim head coach for Philadelphia Eagles at the end of the 2015 season. He has been an offensive coordinator for seven seasons, previously coaching in that role with the Minnesota Vikings (2016–2017), Philadelphia Eagles (2013–2015) and the St. Louis Rams (2009–2010).

Early life and playing career
Born in Dearborn, Michigan, Shurmur comes from a football background. His uncle Fritz Shurmur was an NFL coach for 24 years, including a stint as the Green Bay Packers defensive coordinator from 1994 to 1998, which included a victory in Super Bowl XXXI.

After graduating from Divine Child High School, Shurmur attended Michigan State University, where he was a four-year letterman for the Michigan State Spartans football team. He played guard and linebacker his freshman season, and started at center the next three seasons. He earned All-Big Ten Conference honors and also earned honorable mention All-America honors in 1987, his senior year (MG). He was co-captain when the Spartans defeated the USC Trojans in the Rose Bowl in his senior year. Shurmur was the first graduate student to play on the Michigan State football team, as he began studying for his master's degree in financial administration during his senior season.

Coaching career

Philadelphia Eagles

During Shurmur's NFL coaching career, he has been a part of eight playoff teams, winning six division crowns and appearing in the Super Bowl.

Shurmur began working for the Philadelphia Eagles in 1999, serving as both the tight ends coach and the offensive line coach. Shurmur helped mold tight end Chad Lewis into a three-time Pro Bowl selection.

In 2002, Shurmur was named the team’s quarterback coach. In that role, Shumur helped shape Donovan McNabb into the most prolific passer in Eagles history. McNabb holds nearly every Eagles career passing record, and in 2008, he set Eagles single-season records with 345 completions and 3,916 yards. In 2004, Shurmur and McNabb helped guide the Eagles to their first Super Bowl appearance since the 1980 season.

St. Louis Rams
On January 21, 2009, Shurmur was hired by Steve Spagnuolo to be the offensive coordinator of the St. Louis Rams.

He helped the Rams improve to a 7–9 record following a 1–15 season in 2009, the second-biggest turnaround in the league in 2010. He guided St. Louis’ offense to improvements in nearly every category including total yards, time of possession and third-down percentage, while they also scored 114 more points than the previous year. In addition, the Rams committed just 21 turnovers in 2010, tied for the ninth-lowest total in the NFL.

Shurmur also made a tangible impact on Sam Bradford’s immediate success as a rookie in 2010. The first-overall pick out of the University of Oklahoma set NFL rookie records for most consecutive passes without an interception (169) and most completions (354). Under Shurmur’s tutelage, Bradford finished the season with a 60.0 completion percentage, 3,512 yards and 18 touchdown passes, winning the AP NFL Offensive Rookie of the Year Award.

Cleveland Browns

Shurmur was interviewed by the Cleveland Browns on January 7, 2011 to be their head coach. On January 13, 2011, Shurmur was hired by Mike Holmgren, with whom he shares agent Bob LaMonte, to become the next head coach of the Cleveland Browns. He was the 13th head coach in franchise history, and the sixth since the franchise's revival in 1999.

Part of the reason Shurmur was hired was the team wanted him to call the plays on offense as Holmgren did in Green Bay and Seattle. 
Another reason for the hire was Shurmur's past success of developing young quarterbacks such as McNabb and Bradford. The Browns selected quarterback Colt McCoy in the third round of the 2010 NFL Draft, and in McCoy’s first season with Shurmur as his coach, the former University of Texas standout posted a slight improvement in 2011, throwing for 2,733 yards and 14 touchdown passes in 13 games. Despite this, the Browns went 4–12 that season, a regression from the previous years 5–11 campaign. In the 2012 season, the Browns showed little progress behind new starter and first round draft pick, Brandon Weeden, who finished 29th out of 32 qualified starters in passer rating.

After the end of the 2012 season, Shurmur and general manager Tom Heckert, Jr. were fired, after accumulating a 9–23 record over the course of the 2011 and 2012 seasons and having finished 25th in the NFL in offensive yards gained in the 2012 season.

Second stint with Eagles
On January 20, 2013, Shurmur accepted a job with the Philadelphia Eagles as their offensive coordinator. Working alongside new head coach Chip Kelly, Shurmur helped orchestrate one of the most efficient offenses in the NFL. Shurmur led an offense that set a number of team records, including points (442), total net yards (6,676), touchdowns (53), passing yards (4,406) and fewest turnovers (19) en route to an NFC East title. Additionally, the Eagles set an NFL record with 99 plays of 20+ yards and became the first team since the 1991 Buffalo Bills to lead the league in rushing while ranking last in time of possession.

Shurmur’s unique ability to develop young talent at the quarterback position was once again on display in 2013. Second-year QB Nick Foles enjoyed a breakout season under the direction of Shurmur, throwing for 27 touchdowns and only two interceptions while posting the third-best QB rating (119.2) and third-lowest interception percentage (0.63%) in NFL history. Foles also became just the seventh player in league history to throw for seven touchdowns in a game during a match-up against the Oakland Raiders, and one of three who have done so without throwing an interception.

Interim head coach
Shurmur was named interim head coach of the Eagles after Kelly was fired on December 29, 2015. Shurmur's one game was a 35–30 win over the Giants that was for 2nd place in the NFC East. The Eagles offense gained 435 yards of total offense and scored four touchdowns, highlighted by DeMarco Murray running for a 54-yard touchdown in his first carry under Shurmur. Shurmur interviewed for the Eagles' head coaching job and was considered one of the leading candidates until the end, but he lost out to Chiefs offensive coordinator Doug Pederson.

Minnesota Vikings
On January 25, 2016, the Minnesota Vikings named Shurmur their new tight ends coach. On November 2, 2016, the Vikings promoted him to interim offensive coordinator in the wake of Norv Turner's resignation. He was confirmed for the position for the 2017 season. The Vikings finished the season ranked 11th highest scoring offense, after being only 28th overall in 2016. Second-string quarterback Case Keenum posted the best season of his five-year NFL career, after taking over for Sam Bradford, who suffered a knee injury in Week 1. Shurmur was named the NFL Assistant Coach of the Year for the 2017 season.

New York Giants

On January 22, 2018, Shurmur was hired by the New York Giants as their head coach to replace the fired Ben McAdoo.

In his first season as head coach, Shurmur led the team to a 5–11 record.

Following the season, the team used the sixth overall pick in the 2019 NFL Draft, to select quarterback Daniel Jones. After starting the 2019 season 0–2, Shurmur named Jones the starter on September 17, 2019, replacing Eli Manning. On December 30, Shurmur was fired by the Giants after the team finished the season 4–12 and missed the playoffs.

Denver Broncos 
On January 14, 2020, Shurmur was hired by the Denver Broncos as their offensive coordinator, replacing Rich Scangarello.

On December 26, 2021 in week 16 of the 2021 NFL season game against the Las Vegas Raiders, Shurmur's offensive game plan made Broncos history as it yielded 40 offensive plays, eight first downs, and 158 yards of total offense. which is the second-fewest in a game in which the Broncos had a true quarterback playing in the last 29 years. The run offense managed just 18 yards on 16 carries, which is tied for the third-fewest in franchise history. 

On January 9, 2022, Shurmur and Broncos head coach Vic Fangio were fired.

Personal life
Shurmur's wife, Jennifer, also attended Michigan State. They have four children together.

His son, Kyle Shurmur, committed to play at Vanderbilt and was rated as a top QB prospect for the 2015 recruiting class.  ESPN rated Kyle as the #110 overall player and #7 Pocket Passing QB. He became the starting quarterback as a sophomore in 2016 and continued that role in 2017 and 2018. He signed with the Kansas City Chiefs as an undrafted free agent after not being selected in the 2019 NFL Draft.

Shurmur is the nephew of the late Fritz Shurmur, former defensive coordinator for the Green Bay Packers, who wrote a book on coaching football, Coaching Team Defense.

Head coaching record

* – Interim head coach

References

External links

 

1965 births
Living people
American football centers
American football linebackers
Cleveland Browns head coaches
Cleveland Browns coaches
Denver Broncos coaches
Michigan State Spartans football coaches
Michigan State Spartans football players
Minnesota Vikings coaches
National Football League offensive coordinators
New York Giants head coaches
New York Giants coaches
Philadelphia Eagles coaches
Philadelphia Eagles head coaches
St. Louis Rams coaches
Stanford Cardinal football coaches
Players of American football from Ann Arbor, Michigan